Frank van Harmelen (born 1960) is a Dutch computer scientist and professor in Knowledge Representation & Reasoning in the AI department at the Vrije Universiteit Amsterdam. He was scientific director of the LarKC project (2008-2011), "aiming to develop the Large Knowledge Collider, a platform for very large scale semantic web reasoning."

Biography 
After studying mathematics and computer science in Amsterdam, Van Harmelen moved to the Department of AI of the University of Edinburgh, where he was awarded a PhD in 1989 for his research on meta-level reasoning. While in Edinburgh, he "co-developed a logic-based toolkit for expert systems, and worked with Alan Bundy on proof planning for inductive theorem proving".

After his PhD research, he moved back to Amsterdam where he worked from 1990 to 1995 in the SWI Department under Professor Bob Wielinga, on the use of reflection in expert systems, on the formal underpinnings of the CommonKADS methodology for Knowledge-Based Systems. In 1995 he joined the AI research group at the Vrije Universiteit Amsterdam, where he co-lead the On-To-Knowledge project, one of the first Semantic Web projects. He was appointed full professor in 2002, and is leading the Knowledge Representation and Reasoning Group. Currently he is scientific director the LarKC project aiming to develop the Large Knowledge Collider, a platform for very large scale semantic web reasoning.

Van Harmelen was elected a member of the Royal Netherlands Academy of Arts and Sciences in 2017.

In 2019, Van Harmelen received a Zwaartekracht grant from the Dutch Ministry of Education, Culture and Science for The Hybrid Intelligence Center

Work 
Van Harmelen's research interests include artificial intelligence, knowledge representation and the semantic web, approximate reasoning and Medical Protocols. He was one of the co-designers of the  Web Ontology Language (OWL) and the Ontology Inference Layer (OIL), and has published books on meta-level inference, on knowledge-based systems, and on the Semantic Web.

Publications 
Van Harmelen has published several books and over 100 research papers, Books:
 1989. Logic-Based Knowledge Representation. With P. Jackson and H. Reichgelt. The MIT Press, Cambridge, MA, 1989. .
 1991. Meta-level Inference Systems F. van Harmelen. Research Notes in AI. Pitmann, Morgan Kaufmann, London, San Mateo, California, 1991. 
 2003. Towards the semantic web: ontology-driven knowledge management With John Davies and Dieter Fensel (eds.) John Wiley & Sons, 2002, 
 2004. A Semantic Web Primer (Cooperative Information Systems). With Grigoris Antoniou. MIT Press. 
 2004. Information Sharing on the Semantic Web. With Heiner Stuckenschmidt. Springer. 
 2008. Handbook of Knowledge Representation. With V. Lifschitz and B. Porter, Elsevier, 2008. .

Articles, a selection:

References

External links 
 An interview with Frank van Harmelen about the Semantic Web
 Blog written by Frank van Harmelen 

1960 births
Living people
Alumni of the University of Edinburgh
Artificial intelligence researchers
Dutch computer scientists
Members of the Royal Netherlands Academy of Arts and Sciences
Semantic Web people
Vrije Universiteit Amsterdam alumni
Academic staff of Vrije Universiteit Amsterdam